Multilink may refer to:
Multi-link suspension, a type of vehicle suspension design
Multilink PPP, a type of communications protocol
Multilink Procedure
Multilink striping, a type of data striping used in telecommunications